Lucinda's Spell is a 1998 American fantasy film starring Christina Fulton, Jon Jacobs, and written and directed by Jon Jacobs.

Plot
A wizard returns to Earth and lands in New Orleans in search of a mate.  He runs into a call girl he slept with years which, unbeknownst to him, had resulted in her giving birth to his son.

Home video
ADV Films released the film on DVD and VHS in October 2000.

References

External links

1998 films
1998 fantasy films
American independent films
1990s English-language films
1990s American films